Guariba is a municipality in the state of São Paulo in Brazil. The population is 40,487 (2020 est.) in an area of 270 km². The elevation is 618 m.

References

Municipalities in São Paulo (state)